There are over 20,000 Grade II* listed buildings in England.  This page is a list of these buildings in Oadby and Wigston.

Oadby and Wigston

|}

Notes

External links

 Oadby and Wigston
listed buildings
Oadby and Wigston